The following outline is provided as an overview of and topical guide to the Netherlands Antilles:

The Netherlands Antilles (Dutch: , Papiamento: Antia Hulandes) was an autonomous Caribbean country within the Kingdom of the Netherlands, consisting of two groups of islands in the Lesser Antilles: Aruba, Curaçao and Bonaire, in Leeward Antilles just off the Venezuelan coast; and Sint Eustatius, Saba and Sint Maarten, in the Leeward Islands southeast of the Virgin Islands. Aruba seceded in 1986 as a separate country within the Kingdom of the Netherlands, and the rest of the Netherlands Antilles was dissolved on 10 October 2010, resulting in two new constituent countries, Curaçao and Sint Maarten, with the other islands joining the Netherlands as special municipalities.

General reference 

 Pronunciation:
 Common English country name:  The Netherlands Antilles
 Official English country name:  The Netherlands Antilles of the Kingdom of the Netherlands
 Common endonym(s):  
 Official endonym(s):  
 Adjectival(s): Dutch Antillean
 Demonym(s):
 ISO country codes:  AN, ANT, 530
 ISO region codes:  See ISO 3166-2:AN
 Internet country code top-level domain:  .an

Geography of the Netherlands Antilles 

 Netherlands Antilles was: a territory of the Netherlands
 Dissolved: 10 October 2010,
 Location:
 Northern Hemisphere and Western Hemisphere
 North America (though not on the mainland)
 Atlantic Ocean
 North Atlantic
 Caribbean
 Antilles
 Lesser Antilles (island chain)
 Time zone:  Eastern Caribbean Time (UTC-04)
 Extreme points of the Netherlands Antilles
 High:  Mount Scenery on Saba 
 Low:  Caribbean Sea 0 m
 Land boundaries:   15 km
 Coastline:  Caribbean Sea 364 km
 Atlas of the Netherlands Antilles

Environment of the Netherlands Antilles 

 Wildlife of the Netherlands Antilles
 List of Lepidoptera of the Netherlands Antilles
 List of mammals of the Netherlands Antilles

Natural geographic features of the Netherlands Antilles 

 Islands of the Netherlands Antilles:
 Aruba
 Bonaire
 Curaçao
 Saba
 Sint Eustatius
 Sint Maarten
 Volcanoes in the Netherlands Antilles
 World Heritage Sites in the Netherlands Antilles

Regions of the Netherlands Antilles

Administrative divisions of the Netherlands Antilles 
 Island territories of the Netherlands Antilles
 List of cities in the Netherlands Antilles

Demography of the Netherlands Antilles 

Demographics of the Netherlands Antilles

Government and politics of the Netherlands Antilles 

Politics of the Netherlands Antilles
 Form of government: parliamentary representative democratic country
 Capital of the Netherlands Antilles: Willemstad
 Elections in the Netherlands Antilles
 Political parties in the Netherlands Antilles

Branches of government of the Netherlands Antilles 

Government of the Netherlands Antilles

Executive branch of the Netherlands Antilles 
 Head of state: Monarchy of the Netherlands
 Governor of the Netherlands Antilles (representative of the King)
 Head of government: Prime Minister of the Netherlands Antilles,
 List of prime ministers of the Netherlands Antilles
 Cabinet of the Netherlands Antilles: the Prime Minister headed an eight-member Cabinet.

Legislative branch of the Netherlands Antilles 

 Parliament (unicameral): Estates of the Netherlands Antilles

Judicial branch of the Netherlands Antilles 

 Supreme Court of the Netherlands – dealt with final appeals from the Joint Court of Justice (below).
 Joint Court of Justice of the Netherlands Antilles and Aruba – dealt with civil, criminal, and administrative (e.g. tax) cases.

International organization membership of the Netherlands Antilles 

The government of the Netherlands Antilles was a member of:
Caribbean Community and Common Market (Caricom) (observer)
International Criminal Police Organization (Interpol)
International Labour Organization (ILO)
International Monetary Fund (IMF)
International Olympic Committee (IOC)
United Nations Educational, Scientific, and Cultural Organization (UNESCO) (associate)
Universal Postal Union (UPU)
World Confederation of Labour (WCL)
World Customs Organization (WCO)
World Meteorological Organization (WMO)
World Tourism Organization (UNWTO) (associate)

Law and order in the Netherlands Antilles 

 Constitution of the Netherlands Antilles
 Islands Regulation of the Netherlands Antilles
 Law enforcement in the Netherlands Antilles  –
 Netherlands Antilles & Aruba Coast Guard

Military of the Netherlands Antilles

Military of the Netherlands Antilles
 Forces (Netherlands Antilles didn't have military forces of its own)
 Army of the Netherlands Antilles
 Air Force of the Netherlands Antilles

Local government of the Netherlands Antilles 

Local government in the Netherlands Antilles
 Island councils

History of the Netherlands Antilles 

History of the Netherlands Antilles
 Cassard expedition
 Dissolution of the Netherlands Antilles

Culture of the Netherlands Antilles 

Culture of the Netherlands Antilles
 National symbols of the Netherlands Antilles
 Coat of arms of the Netherlands Antilles
 Flag of the Netherlands Antilles
 National anthem of the Netherlands Antilles
 People of the Netherlands Antilles
 Religion in the Netherlands Antilles
 Christianity in the Netherlands Antilles
 Hinduism in the Netherlands Antilles
 Islam in the Netherlands Antilles
 Judaism in the Netherlands Antilles
 World Heritage Sites in the Netherlands Antilles

Arts of the Netherlands Antilles 
 Music of the former Netherlands Antilles

Sports in the Netherlands Antilles 

Sports in the Netherlands Antilles
 Football in the Netherlands Antilles
 List of football clubs in the Netherlands Antilles
 Netherlands Antilles national football team
 Netherlands Antilles national under-20 football team
 Netherlands Antilles women's national football team
 Netherlands Antilles Championship
 Netherlands Antilles at the Olympics
 Netherlands Antilles Olympic Committee
 Netherlands Antilles at the Summer Olympics
 Netherlands Antilles at the 1952 Summer Olympics
 Netherlands Antilles at the 1960 Summer Olympics
 Netherlands Antilles at the 1964 Summer Olympics
 Netherlands Antilles at the 1968 Summer Olympics
 Netherlands Antilles at the 1972 Summer Olympics
 Netherlands Antilles at the 1976 Summer Olympics
 Netherlands Antilles at the 1984 Summer Olympics
 Netherlands Antilles at the 1988 Summer Olympics
 Netherlands Antilles at the 1992 Summer Olympics
 Netherlands Antilles at the 1996 Summer Olympics
 Netherlands Antilles at the 2000 Summer Olympics
 Netherlands Antilles at the 2004 Summer Olympics
 Netherlands Antilles at the 2008 Summer Olympics
 Netherlands Antilles at the Winter Olympics
 Netherlands Antilles at the 1988 Winter Olympics
 Netherlands Antilles at the 1992 Winter Olympics
 Netherlands Antilles at the Pan American Games
 Netherlands Antilles at the 1991 Pan American Games
 Netherlands Antilles at the 1999 Pan American Games
 Netherlands Antilles at the 2003 Pan American Games
 Netherlands Antilles at the 2007 Pan American Games
 Netherlands Antilles at the 2011 Pan American Games
 Tennis in the Netherlands Antilles
 Netherlands Antilles Davis Cup team
 Netherlands Antilles Tennis Federation
 Other
 Netherlands Antilles at the 2009 World Championships in Athletics
 Netherlands Antilles at the 2010 Central American and Caribbean Games
 Netherlands Antilles at the 2010 Summer Youth Olympics
 Netherlands Antilles at the 2012 UCI Road World Championships
 Netherlands Antilles at the 2011 World Aquatics Championships
 Netherlands Antilles at the 2013 World Aquatics Championships
 Netherlands Antilles at the South American Games
 Netherlands Antilles national baseball team
 Netherlands Antilles women's national softball team

Economy and infrastructure of the Netherlands Antilles 

Economy of the Netherlands Antilles
 Economic rank, by nominal GDP (2007): 145th (one hundred and forty fifth)
 Banking in the Netherlands Antilles
 Communications in the Netherlands Antilles
 Internet in the Netherlands Antilles
 Postage stamps and postal history of the Netherlands Antilles
Currency of the Netherlands Antilles: Guilder
ISO 4217: ANG
 Transport in the Netherlands Antilles
 Airports in the Netherlands Antilles

Education in the Netherlands Antilles 

 List of universities in the Netherlands Antilles

See also

Netherlands Antilles
List of international rankings
Outline of geography
Outline of North America
Outline of South America
Outline of the Netherlands

 Netherlands Antilles general election, 2006
 Netherlands Antilles general election, 2010

References

External links

 GOV.an - Main governmental site
 Central Bank of the Netherlands Antilles
 map
 Antillenhuis - Cabinet of the Netherlands Antilles' Plenipotentiary Minister in the Netherlands
 CIA World Factbook: Netherlands Antilles
 Antilles break-up closer
 Werken en Wonen op de Antillen - Information about living and working on the Netherlands Antilles

Netherlands Antilles